Debra E. Lekanoff (born February 26, 1971) is a Democratic member of the Washington Legislature representing the State's 40th House district for position 1. She is a member of the Tlingit tribe and the second female tribal member to serve in the Washington House of Representatives after Lois Stratton.

Career
Lekanoff won the election on 6 November 2018 from the platform of Democratic Party. She secured sixty-seven percent of the vote while her closest rival Republican Michael Petrish secured thirty-three percent.

Electoral history

References

External links 
 Debra Lekanoff at ballotpedia.org

Lekanoff, Debra
Living people
21st-century American politicians
21st-century American women politicians
Women state legislators in Washington (state)
1971 births
L
Tlingit people
21st-century Native American women
21st-century Native American politicians